Laura Scherian (born 26 June 1988) is an Australian netball player in the Suncorp Super Netball league, playing for the Sunshine Coast Lightning.

Scherian began her netball career in the Commonwealth Bank Trophy at the now-defunct AIS Canberra Darters in 2007, before being picked up by the Queensland Firebirds in 2010 in the ANZ Championship. She was not re-signed by the Firebirds in 2011 which led her to be relegated to the second-tier Queensland Fusion team in the Australian Netball League, where she played at for the next six years as an amateur. She would play only sporadically for the Firebirds in those years when required to replace an injured contracted player. In 2017 she was signed as the last contracted player at the Sunshine Coast Lightning in the new Suncorp Super Netball league, the club she has played at ever since. In her first match at the Lightning, Scherian was named the most valuable player as the side drew with the Firebirds in the opening match of the season. She has signed with the Lightning through to the end of the season.

References

External links
 Sunshine Coast Lightning profile
 Suncorp Super Netball profile
 Netball Draft Central profile

1988 births
Australian netball players
Queensland Firebirds players
Sunshine Coast Lightning players
Living people
Suncorp Super Netball players
Australian Netball League players
Netball players from Queensland
AIS Canberra Darters players
Australian Institute of Sport netball players
Queensland Fusion players
People educated at John Paul College (Brisbane)
Australia international netball players
Queensland state netball league players